Tony McTague (born January 1946 in Clonakilty, County Cork) is an Irish former Gaelic footballer who played for the Ferbane club and at senior level for the Offaly county team from 1965 until 1975.

McTague captained Offaly to the All-Ireland SFC title in 1972.

He was inducted into the GAA Hall of Fame in 2013.

McTague is his county's top scorer in National Football League history, finishing his career with 9–360 (387) in that competition.

References

 

1946 births
Living people
All Stars Awards winners (football)
Cork Gaelic footballers
ESB people
Ferbane Gaelic footballers
Leinster inter-provincial Gaelic footballers
Offaly inter-county Gaelic footballers